North Vernon Downtown Historic District is a national historic district located at North Vernon, Jennings County, Indiana.  It encompasses 80 contributing buildings and 1 contributing structure in the central business district of North Vernon.  The district developed between about 1852 and 1955, and includes notable examples of Federal, Italianate, Classical Revival, and Bungalow / American Craftsman style architecture. Notable contributing buildings include the First Christian Church (c. 1890, 1940), M.T. Lindley Building (1891), N.C. Bank (c. 1910), Masonic Lodge (1899), Red Man Lodge #99 (c. 1880), Jennings County Carnegie Library (1920), Bantz Building (c. 1880), Ades Building (1913), Perry-Verbiage Building (c. 1885), Couchman Building (c. 1870, 1910), and Gottwalles Grocery (1893).

It was listed on the National Register of Historic Places in 2006.

References

Historic districts on the National Register of Historic Places in Indiana
Italianate architecture in Indiana
Neoclassical architecture in Indiana
Federal architecture in Indiana
Historic districts in Jennings County, Indiana
National Register of Historic Places in Jennings County, Indiana